Richard Desjardins (born March 16, 1948) is a Québécois folk singer and film director.

Career
Desjardins and his friends formed the country rock ensemble Abbitibbi in the 1970s; Desjardins played piano, guitar, and sang. When the group disbanded in 1982, Desjardins pursued a solo career. He released a number of solo albums, including Tu m'aimes-tu in 1990 and Boom Boom, which appeared on the RPM 100 Top Albums list in 1998.

Desjardins also found work scoring films, especially documentaries. This involvement in the Quebec film industry even led him to co-direct a number of feature-length documentaries.  He was known for his environmental activism, especially with regards to protecting forests from over-exploitation, and to promote this he created the documentary film L'erreur boréale in 1999. In 2007 Desjardins, along with Robert Monderie, created The Invisible People, a documentary about the Algonquin nation in Quebec.

Desjardins went on tour in 2013, promoting his album L'existoire; after that he made occasional live appearances, including the 2018 Festival guitares du monde in Abitibi.

In 2017 a group of singers came together at Steve Jolin's Rouyn-Noranda record company to record Chanter Richard Desjardins, a tribute album of Desjardins' songs.

He was profiled in Lisette Marcotte's 2019 documentary film The Last Nataq (Le dernier Nataq).

Discography
Albums
 1981-Boom Town Café (with Abbittibbi)
 1988-Les derniers humains
 1989-Le trésor de la langue (with René Lussier)
 1990-Tu m'aimes-tu
 1992-Les derniers humains (new recording)
 1994-Chaude était la nuit (with Abbittibbi)
 1998-Boom Boom
 2003-Kanasuta
 2011-L'existoire

Live albums
 1993-Richard Desjardins au Club Soda
 1996-Desjardins Abbittibbi Live (with Abbittibbi)

Soundtrack
 1990-Le Party

DVD
 Kanasuta - Là où les diables vont danser (2005)

Filmography
 1977 - A Raging Disaster (Comme des chiens en pacage) by Desjardins and Robert Monderie
 1978 - Firefly (Mouche à feu), by Desjardins and Robert Monderie
 1999 - Forest Alert (L'erreur boréale) by Desjardins and Robert Monderie
 2007 - The Invisible Nation (Le peuple invisible) by Desjardins and Robert Monderie
 2011 - The Hole Story (Trou story) by Desjardins and Robert Monderie

Music for films and theater
 À double tour (English title: Twice Convicted), by Marie Cadieux, 1994
 The Party (Le Party) by Pierre Falardeau, 1990
 La Nuit avec Hortense (The night with Hortense), by Jean Chabot, 1988
 Noranda, by Robert Monderie and Daniel Corvec, 1984
 Le doux partage (Soft Sharing) by Sylvie van Brabant, 1983
 Depuis que le monde est monde (Since the world is world) by Sylvie van Brabant, 1981
 Blue Winter (L'hiver bleu) by André Blanchard, 1978
 Beat by André Blanchard, 1976 (Desjardins and Abbittibbi as well as other musicians)
 Composed music for and was musical director of ”Têtes rondes et têtes pointues“ ("The Roundheads and the Peakheads") by Bertold Brecht, at the 1986 Brecht International Festival in Toronto.

Bibliography
 Carole Couture, "la parole est mine d’or", Éditions Tryptique, Montréal, 1999.

References

External links
Desjardins' web site.
Words to 59 of Desjardins' songs. (site down)
Radio Canada (Documentary about Richard Desjardins) 
 Radio France, France Blue (Interviews with Desjardins) 
 Summary of Desjardins Life’s work 

1948 births
Living people
French Quebecers
Canadian male singer-songwriters
Canadian folk singer-songwriters
French-language singers of Canada
People from Rouyn-Noranda
Film directors from Quebec
Canadian documentary film directors
Canadian environmentalists
Singers from Quebec
Songwriters from Quebec
Canadian film score composers
Félix Award winners